John Dupraz (born 8 July 1945 in Geneva) is a Swiss politician and member of the National Council from the Canton of Geneva until 2007. 

He was a member of the Grand Council of Geneva from October 1973 till October 1989, then again since October 1993. He was elected to the National Council in 1995, on the list of the Free Democratic Party, and to the Parliamentary Assembly of the Council of Europe from 2003 until 2007.

References
 
 John Dupraz, on the web site of the Council of Europe.

1945 births
Living people
Members of the National Council (Switzerland)
Free Democratic Party of Switzerland politicians
FDP.The Liberals politicians